McLean County is the largest county by land area in the U.S. state of Illinois. According to the 2020 Census, it had a population of 170,954. Its county seat is Bloomington. McLean County is included in the Bloomington–Normal, IL Metropolitan Statistical Area.

Pronunciation
Locally, the second syllable of McLean is pronounced with a 'long a' (ā, IPA /ei/) sound (i.e. "muh-KLAIN") (as with native son McLean Stevenson), not with a 'long e' (ē, IPA /i/) sound ("muh-KLEEN").

History
The first white settlers in what became McLean County arrived around 1821.  The first settlement was Blooming Grove, established in 1822 near present-day Bloomington.  McLean County was formed late in 1830 out of Tazewell County. It was named for John McLean, United States Senator for Illinois, who died in 1830.

Geography
It is the largest county in Illinois by land area and third-largest by total area after Cook and Lake Counties, which have large portions of their areas on Lake Michigan. McLean County is actually larger than the land area of Rhode Island (1045 sq mi).

Climate and weather

Adjacent counties

 Woodford County - northwest
 Livingston County - northeast
 Ford County - east
 Champaign County - southeast
 Piatt County - south
 DeWitt County - south
 Logan County - southwest
 Tazewell County - west

Major highways

  Interstate 39
  Interstate 55
  Interstate 74
  U.S. Highway 24
  U.S. Highway 51
  U.S. Highway 66
  U.S. Highway 136
  U.S. Highway 150
  Illinois Route 9
  Illinois Route 54
  Illinois Route 122
  Illinois Route 165
  Illinois Route 251

Transit
 Connect Transit
 Uptown Station
 List of intercity bus stops in Illinois

Demographics

As of the 2010 United States Census, there were 169,572 people, 65,104 households, and 40,124 families residing in the county. The racial makeup of the county was 84.3% white, 7.3% black or African American, 4.3% Asian, 0.2% American Indian, 1.5% from other races, and 2.3% from two or more races. Those of Hispanic or Latino origin made up 4.4% of the population. In terms of ancestry, 31.2% were German, 15.4% were Irish, 11.4% were American, and 11.0% were English.

Of the 65,104 households, 31.4% had children under the age of 18 living with them, 48.5% were married couples living together, 9.6% had a female householder with no husband present, 38.4% were non-families, and 28.1% of all households were made up of individuals. The average household size was 2.44 and the average family size was 3.02. The median age was 32.1 years.

The median income for a household in the county was $57,642 and the median income for a family was $77,093. Males had a median income of $52,271 versus $39,685 for females. The per capita income for the county was $28,167. About 6.2% of families and 12.9% of the population were below the poverty line, including 11.4% of those under age 18 and 5.5% of those age 65 or over.

Communities

Cities
 Bloomington (seat)
 Chenoa
 El Paso
 Le Roy
 Lexington

Town
 Normal

Villages

 Anchor
 Arrowsmith
 Bellflower
 Carlock
 Colfax
 Cooksville
 Danvers
 Downs
 Ellsworth
 Gridley
 Heyworth
 Hudson
 McLean
 Saybrook
 Stanford
 Towanda

Census-designated place
 Twin Grove

Other unincorporated communities

 Barnes
 Bentown
 Bloomington Heights
 Covell
 Cropsey
 Fletcher
 Funks Grove
 Gillum
 Hendrix
 Holder
 Kerrick
 Laurette
 Lytleville
 Meadows
 Merna
 Padua
 Randolph
 Sabina
 Shirley
 Watkins
 Weedman
 Weston
 Yuton

Townships
McLean County is divided into these townships:

 Allin
 Anchor
 Arrowsmith
 Bellflower
 Bloomington
 Bloomington City
 Blue Mound
 Cheney's Grove
 Chenoa
 Cropsey
 Dale
 Danvers
 Dawson
 Downs
 Dry Grove
 Empire
 Funk's Grove
 Gridley
 Hudson
 Lawndale
 Lexington
 Martin
 Money Creek
 Mount Hope
 Normal
 Old Town
 Randolph
 Towanda
 West
 White Oak
 Yates

Ghost towns 
 Allin
 Benjaminville
 Kumler

Government
McLean County has a twenty-member board representing ten districts within the county. Each district elects two members. Districts 1-3 encompass all of the county outside of Bloomington and Normal. Districts 4-6 are within the town limits of Normal, and districts 7-10 are within Bloomington city limits.

Politics
Like most of central Illinois, McLean County is historically Republican-leaning. The only Democrats to gain an absolute majority of the county's vote since the Civil War have been Franklin D. Roosevelt in 1932 and 1936, Lyndon Johnson by a mere 1.2% in 1964, and Joe Biden in 2020. Illinois resident Barack Obama in 2008 and Woodrow Wilson in 1912 both carried the county by narrow pluralities.

The county has not swung as heavily to the Democrats as other counties dominated by college towns. In recent years, however, McLean has trended sufficiently Democratic that Hillary Clinton in 2016 lost the county by just 1.3 percent, while Biden won the county in 2020 with a narrow majority.

McLean County is one of only thirteen counties to have voted for Obama in 2008, Romney in 2012, Trump in 2016, and Biden in 2020.

Education
Here is a list of school districts (all fully K-12) with territory in the county, no matter how slight, even if the district's schools and/or administrative offices are not in the county:
 Blue Ridge Community Unit School District 18
 Bloomington School District 87
 El Paso-Gridley Community Unit School District 11
 Gibson City-Melvin-Sibley Community Unit School District 5
 Heyworth Community Unit School District 4
 Le Roy Community Unit School District 2
 Lexington Community Unit School District 7
 McLean County Unit School District 5
 Olympia Community Unit School District 16
 Prairie Central Community Unit School District 8
 Ridgeview Community Unit School District 19
 Tri-Valley Community Unit School District 3

Illinois State University is in the county.

Notable persons
 George J. Mecherle, founder of State Farm
 Adlai Stevenson II, Governor of Illinois (1949–53), two-time Democratic nominee for the U.S. presidency, and Ambassador to the United Nations (1961–65)
 Pokey LaFarge, musician and songwriter
 Bonnie Lou, recording artist and television celebrity
 William H. Rowe, farmer, businessman, and politician

See also
 National Register of Historic Places listings in McLean County, Illinois

Notes

References

External links

 McLean County Government Web Site
 McLean County Divorce
 Map of McLean Co., showing political subdivisions

 
Illinois counties
1830 establishments in Illinois
Populated places established in 1830